The Bullets would stun their fans and the entire league by trading Earl "The Pearl" Monroe. The trade was done three games into the season and Monroe was sent to the rival New York Knicks.
The Bullets received Dave Stallworth, Mike Riordan, and cash.
The Bullets did not adjust well to not having Monroe as they finished the season with a 38–44 record. The losing record would still be good enough to win the Central Division. In the playoffs, the Bullets would face Monroe and the New York Knicks and be beaten by the Knicks in six games.

Draft picks

Roster

Regular season

Season standings

Record vs. opponents

Game log

Playoffs

|- align="center" bgcolor="#ccffcc"
| 1
| March 31
| New York
| W 108–105 (OT)
| Archie Clark (38)
| Wes Unseld (18)
| Wes Unseld (6)
| Baltimore Civic Center12,289
| 1–0
|- align="center" bgcolor="#ffcccc"
| 2
| April 2
| @ New York
| L 88–110
| Archie Clark (18)
| Unseld, Tresvant (10)
| Archie Clark (7)
| Madison Square Garden19,588
| 1–1
|- align="center" bgcolor="#ccffcc"
| 3
| April 4
| New York
| W 104–103
| Archie Clark (35)
| Unseld, Tresvant (12)
| Unseld, Clark (9)
| Baltimore Civic Center12,289
| 2–1
|- align="center" bgcolor="#ffcccc"
| 4
| April 6
| @ New York
| L 98–104
| Archie Clark (22)
| Wes Unseld (16)
| Archie Clark (6)
| Madison Square Garden19,588
| 2–2
|- align="center" bgcolor="#ffcccc"
| 5
| April 9
| New York
| L 82–106
| Mike Riordan (16)
| Wes Unseld (13)
| Archie Clark (9)
| Baltimore Civic Center10,244
| 2–3
|- align="center" bgcolor="#ffcccc"
| 6
| April 11
| @ New York
| L 101–107
| Archie Clark (31)
| John Tresvant (8)
| Archie Clark (11)
| Madison Square Garden19,588
| 2–4
|-

Awards and honors
 Archie Clark, All-NBA Second Team
 Phil Chenier, NBA All-Rookie Team 1st Team

References

 Bullets on Basketball Reference

Baltimore
Washington Wizards seasons
Baltimore Bullets
Baltimore Bullets